"Little Green Bag" is a 1969 song written by Dutch musicians Jan Visser and George Baker (born Hans Bouwens), and recorded by the George Baker Selection at the band's own expense. The track was released as the George Baker Selection's debut single by Dutch label Negram, the B-side being "Pretty Little Dreamer".

Background

The track's original title was "Little Greenback", which is slang for a US dollar. However, the single was given the erroneous title "Little Green Bag", which some took to be a "bag of marijuana". The lyrics of the song adds to the belief that it's about marijuana, since it describes quite similarly the confusion of trying to find the bag, which is a common thing marijuana smokers experience. The "Little Green Bag" title was then retained for all subsequently released versions of the single, as well as the group's 1970 debut album, also titled Little Green Bag.

The single peaked at No. 9 on the Dutch Top 40 singles chart and No. 3 in Belgium. In the United States, the single reached No. 16 in the middle of 1970 on the Cashbox chart and No. 21 on the US Billboard Top 100. In 1992, when the song was used in Quentin Tarantino's film Reservoir Dogs with song writers cited as Jan Gerbrand Visser and Benjamino Bouwens, it became an international cult classic. Also that year, the song reached No. 1 in Japan after being used in a Japanese whiskey commercial.

Charts

Cover versions
In 1970, the group I Punti Cardinali released a version titled "La borsetta verde".
In 1970, Quebec singer Bobby Le Clerc recorded a French cover titled "C'est pourquoi".
In 1970, the Italian singer Nada recorded an Italian-language version with translated lyrics by Luigi Albertelli under the title "Un passatempo".
In 1999, Tom Jones released a cover version of the song recorded with Canadian band the Barenaked Ladies, on his album Reload.
In 2007, The Ventures released a version on their album The Ventures – Rocky!
In 2008, meg released a version on her album "Serpent".
In 2012, Garou recorded a cover for his album Rhythm and Blues.
In 2019, Cinemax / HBO Max's Warrior (Season 1, Episode 10) features a partial Cantonese cover before the closing credits. Visuals are an homage to "Reservoir Dogs" opening credits. Musical artist is uncertain.
In 2021, Australian music artist Sarah Brockwell released a cover version on YouTube.

See also
 Mondegreen

References

External links
Lyrics of Little Green Bag from Metrolyrics.com (copy archived March 30, 2020)

1969 debut singles
1970 singles
1969 songs
George Baker Selection songs
Songs written by George Baker (Dutch singer)
Soft rock songs